Büsum station is a railway station in the municipality of Büsum, located in the Dithmarschen district in Schleswig-Holstein, Germany.

References

Railway stations in Schleswig-Holstein
Buildings and structures in Dithmarschen